Philip John Greer Ransom, or John Ransom, (24 September 1935 – 27 March 2019) was a non-fiction author covering principally railway, canal and local history. He was also Hon. Secretary of the Scottish Committee of the Heritage Railway Association.

He died on 27 March 2019.

Books
 Holiday Cruising in Ireland, David & Charles 1971
 Railways Revived, Faber & Faber 1973
 Waterways Restored, Faber & Faber 1974
 Your Book of Canals, Faber & Faber 1977
 The Archaeology of Canals, World's Work 1979
 The Archaeology of Railways, World's Work 1981
 Your Book of Steam Railway Preservation, Faber & Faber 1982
 The Archaeology of the Transport Revolution 1750-1850, World's Work 1984
 Transport in Scotland through the Ages, Richard Drew Publishing 1987
 Scottish Steam Today, Richard Drew Publishing 1989
 The Victorian Railway and How It Evolved, Heinemann 1990
 Loch Earn: A Guide for Visitors, particularly those going afloat, author 1994
 Narrow Gauge Steam - Its origins and worldwide development, Oxford Publishing Co., 1996
 Scotland's Inland Waterways, NMS Publishing, 1999
 The Mont Cenis Fell Railway, Twelveheads Press 1999
 Locomotion: Two Centuries of Train Travel, Sutton Publishing, 2001
 Snow, Flood and Tempest: Railways and Natural Disasters, Ian Allan Publishing 2001
 Loch Lomond and the Trossachs in History and Legend, Birlinn, 2004
 Iron Road: The Railway in Scotland, Birlinn, 2007, 2013
 Steamers of Loch Lomond, Stenlake Publishing Ltd 2007 (text researched and written to accompany pictures selected from publisher's collection)
 Old Loch Lomondside, Stenlake Publishing Ltd 2007 (text researched and written to accompany pictures selected from publisher's collection)
 Old Almondbank, Methven and Glenalmond, Stenlake Publishing Ltd 2010 (text researched and written to accompany pictures selected from publisher's collection)
 Old Arrochar and Loch Long, Stenlake Publishing Ltd 2011 (text researched and written to accompany pictures selected from publisher's collection)
 Bell's Comet - How a Paddle Steamer Changed the Course of History, Amberley Publishing 2012
 Old Dunkeld and Birnam, Stenlake Publishing Ltd 2012 (text researched and written to accompany pictures selected from publisher's collection)
 Old Stanley, Stenlake Publishing Ltd 2013 (text researched and written to accompany pictures selected from publisher's collection)

In addition contributed to the following multi-author works
 Steam into the Seventies, New English Library 1976 (section on North York Moors Railway)
 Encyclopaedia of Railways, Octopus 1977 (section on railway preservation)
 A Guide to the Steam Railways of Great Britain, Pelham Books 1979 (section on Wales)
 Encyclopaedia of the History of Technology, Routledge 1990 (section on railways)
 Biographical Dictionary of the History of Technology, Routledge 1996 (79 short biographies of railway engineers)
 Oxford Companion to British Railway History, edited by Jack Simmons & Gordon Biddle, Oxford University Press 1997 (12 articles)
 Oxford Dictionary of National Biography, Oxford University Press 2004 (3 articles on railway engineers)
 Scottish Life and Society: A Compendium of Scottish Ethnology, vol. 8, Transport and Communications John Donald in association with European Ethnological Research Centre 2009 (Three chapters: Canals and Inland Waterways; Coaching; Railways to 1914).

References

21st-century Scottish historians
2019 deaths
20th-century Scottish historians
Rail transport writers
Railway historians
People educated at Eton College
1935 births